Pompeja (minor planet designation: 203 Pompeja) is a quite large main-belt asteroid. It was discovered by C. H. F. Peters on September 25, 1879, in Clinton, New York, and named after Pompeii, the Roman town destroyed in volcanic eruption in AD 79. The orbital plane is tilted at an angle of 3.2° to the plane of the ecliptic.

Based upon photometric observations taken during 2011, it has a synodic rotation period of 24.052 ± 0.001 h, with a peak-to-peak amplitude of 0.10 ± 0.01 in magnitude. Because the rotation period nearly matches that of the Earth, it required coordinated observations from multiple observatories at widely spaced latitudes to produce a complete light curve. As discovered in 2021, the asteroid has a very red color due to tholins on its surface, similar to trans-Neptunian objects. It is therefore thought to have formed in the outer Solar System despite its current orbit within the asteroid belt.

References

External links 
The Asteroid Orbital Elements Database
Minor Planet Discovery Circumstances
Asteroid Lightcurve Parameters
Asteroid Albedo Compilation
 
 

000203
Discoveries by Christian Peters
Named minor planets
000203
18790925